Lubeni Haukongo (born 24 September 2000 in Mondesa) is a Namibian footballer who plays for Cape Town Spurs of the National First Division.

Club career
Haukongo began his career with hometown club Desert United. He then moved to Swakopmund FC at age seven and progressed through the age categories to the first team. The player then moved on to another Walvis Bay club, Eleven Arrows, where he played in the Namibia Premier League for two seasons.. 

In May 2018 he was spotted by a South African scout and was one of twenty four West African players invited to a trial in Morocco. Following the trial, Haukongo was invited to train with Lille OSC of the French Ligue 1 for four weeks. The transfer was finalized in March 2019. While with the club he played for its reserve side in the Championnat National 2, the fourth tier of the French football league system. Not long after joining the club he sustained an quad muscle tear injuries which sidelined him for almost one year.

In summer 2021 Haukongo joined Chippa United of the South African Premier Division for the 2021–22 season and was immediately named the club captain. The player cited a desire for more playing time following his recovery from injury as the reason for departing Lille at the end of his contract. He made his professional debut with Chippa United against Orlando Pirates on 18 September 2021.

Following one season with Chippa United in which he made only two appearances because of injury, Haukongo signed for Cape Town Spurs of the National First Division in July 2022.

International career
Haukongo represented Namibia at the under-17, under-20, and under-23 youth levels. He was part of the squad that won the 2016 COSAFA Under-17 Championship. 

He received his first senior call up for a friendly against Lesotho in 2018 but did not appear in the match. He was called up next in November 2021 for a 2022 FIFA World Cup qualification match against the Congo.

International career statistics

References

External links
National Football Teams profile
Soccerway profile
Cape Town Spurs profile

2000 births
Namibian men's footballers
Namibia international footballers
Living people
Sportspeople from Swakopmund
Association football defenders
Namibia youth international footballers
Namibian expatriate footballers
Namibian expatriate sportspeople in South Africa